The Zeebo is a 3G-enabled entertainment and education system from Zeebo Inc. It enabled users to play video games, and also connect to the Internet, communicate online and run educational applications. The Zeebo was targeted at developing markets such as Brazil and Mexico. Zeebo Inc. described the Zeebo as bringing "the fun and excitement of interactive entertainment and education to those who—until now—have had little or no access to such technology."

Zeebo was founded by Reinaldo Normand in 2008, based on a working prototype developed by Dave Durnil and business plan by Mike Yuen at Qualcomm. The company's stated intention was to create an affordable console with inexpensive games and educational content delivered via wireless digital distribution to circumvent piracy. The Zeebo doesn't use DVDs or cartridges; games and other content are downloaded wirelessly over broadband cellular networks. In addition to games, the Zeebo system also provides Internet connectivity, enabling users to access educational and information content, communicate via e-mail and do social networking (this capability was supported in Brazil and Mexico).

Before its discontinuation, Zeebo had attracted content from companies such as Activision, Capcom, Digital Chocolate, Disney Interactive Studios, Electronic Arts, Fishlabs, Flying Tiger, Gamevil, G-Mode, Glu, id Software, Limbic Software, Namco, Polarbit, Popcap, Twelve Interactive and Vega Mobile.

History
The Zeebo was first announced in November 2008 in Rio de Janeiro, Brazil and went on sale there in limited quantities on June 1, 2009 with a suggested retail price of 499,00 Brazilian reais. In September of the same year, the price was cut to R$399,00, and the price was reduced again in November to R$299,00 (≈170USD). The console was distributed nationwide in Brazil in December 2009. By August 2010, there were approximately 40 games launched for Zeebo in Brazil. On September 1, 2010, Zeebo announced that it was adding new capabilities and accessories to the Zeebo in Brazil, including Internet connectivity, a keyboard and new more ergonomic gamepad. The new Brazilian system configuration was priced identical to the previous one: R$299 (≈170USD). The company announced that Brazilian owners of previous system configurations can upgrade to the new one for free.

The Zeebo was launched in Mexico in November 2009. It shipped to national retailers across the country on November 4, 2009, with a suggested price of 2,499 Mexican pesos (approximately $205 US). The Mexican system configuration was similar to that introduced in September 2010 and includes Internet connectivity, a keyboard and ergonomic gamepad. The price was cut to 2249 pesos (approx. $184 US) in April 2010.

The Zeebo was available in Brazil and Mexico. Reports indicated that the Zeebo was planned to become available in China by 2011. A release in Russia had also been planned.

Zeebo Inc. announced an agreement with AT&T in March 2010. The company stated that, "The agreement gives us access to AT&T's international roaming network, allowing us to carry out rapid trials of the Zeebo platform in new geographic areas as we establish longer-term agreements with local carriers for deployment of the system. It will also give us a chance to explore opportunities in the US market in the future." However it appears that Tectoy has decided against the Zeebo and on its homepage now states that they are gearing towards a more educational market.

On May 27, 2011, Zeebo announced its end of operations in Brazil and Mexico. According to the company, all games would undergo a price reduction and Zeebonet 3G would remain active until September 30, and all warranty services would be honored. On the same day, on ZeeboNet 3G, a message was added to the details of the game Turma da Mônica em Vamos Brincar ("Monica's Gang in Let's Play"), stating that the game would be unavailable for purchase by the end of the day.

Zeebo's home page still stated that the company was "currently working on a next generation Android-based platform for launch in 2012" but the product had not been released.

Wireless capabilities
The Zeebo system was developed by Zeebo Inc. with the participation of 12 companies, mainly Qualcomm and Tectoy. It was manufactured and distributed by local partners in target countries (e.g., Tectoy in Brazil). The console uses a Qualcomm BREW mobile gaming chipset similar to that in mobile phones. Players are able to buy and download games and other content wirelessly through 3G or EDGE. The user was always connected to the wireless network without any subscription fee. Purchases are made through an online store using a virtual currency, Z-Credits. Zeebo's gaming delivery system reduces costs (with no discs or cartridges needed) and overcomes piracy barriers – two elements that have hindered sales of game consoles in developing markets. Z-Credits are purchased by bank transfer, credit card, bank debit or prepaid cards. Games cost from about 500 to 2500 credits.

The console's wireless connectivity also allows users to browse web sites, send and receive e-mail and take part social networking activities via the wireless network. The Zeebo can also perform "over-the-air" (OTA) updates to the console's firmware—delivering new content, features and bug fixes.

Accessories

Z-Pad
The standard Zeebo "Z-Pad" controller includes a total of 7 buttons, a D-Pad and two analog sticks. On the right side, there are four buttons (numbered 1–4); two shoulder buttons rest on the top, called ZL and ZR; at the center, there is a "Home" button, which takes the user back the start screen of the Zeebo interface, while functioning as a typical "Pause" button during games. Directly below this button are the two analog sticks, whereas the D-Pad is located at the leftmost side.

Boomerang

The Boomerang, sold by Tectoy in Brazil, is a wireless controller with a built-in accelerometer, using motion-sensing technology to play games with actual physical gestures. It has a D-Pad, two buttons (labeled 1–2) on the top-left side, a "Home" button, a sliding on-off switch and a wrist strap. It requires two AA batteries as a power supply.

Keyboard
The Zeebo also includes an external keyboard, used with the system's web-browsing, email and social networking functions.

Games

The Zeebo features remade versions of games from mobile phones and other consoles, such as FIFA 09, Resident Evil 4, Crash Bandicoot Nitro Kart 3D, Galaxy on Fire and Rally Master Pro. There are also a number of original game titles developed specifically for the Zeebo, including “Zeebo Extreme” racing games, "Boomerang Sports" games, Zeebo "Football Club" games and Un Juego de Huevos (known as Um Jogo de Ovos in Brazil), an action-adventure game based on the hit Mexican animated film Una película de huevos from Huevocartoon. In March 2010, Zeebo began releasing a series of classic arcade games. These games were originally created in the 1980s and 1990s by Data East Corp. in Japan and have been modified to run on the Zeebo system. The titles include Caveman Ninja (originally known as Joe & Mac), Spinmaster, Super Burger Time and Dark Seal (also known as Gate of Doom).

In June 2010, in advance of the World Cup, Zeebo released the first of its Football Club ("F.C") titles, Zeebo F.C. Foot Camp, developed by Zeebo Interactive Studios in Brazil. It includes four mini-games, each emphasizing a particular soccer skill, such as dribbling, juggling and goal-kicking. Along with Zeebo F.C. Foot Camp, the company released Zeeboids, an application that enables users to create personal characters ("avatars") to be used with the Football Club games. Also in June, Zeebo announced a variety of forthcoming games from independent developers such as Digital Chocolate, Fishlabs, Limbic Software, Twelve Interactive and Vega Mobile.

In Brazil, the Zeebo was sold with three free games embedded – FIFA 09, Need for Speed Carbon: Own the City and Brain Challenge (known in Portuguese as "Treino Cerebral"). Three other games, all in Portuguese, are available for free download with new systems: Prey Evil, Zeebo Extreme Rolimã and Zeebo Extreme Jetboard. More 30 other titles are available for purchase (via Z-Credits) and download.

On September 1, 2010, Zeebo announced a number of new games and educational applications to be launched in 2010 and 2011. They included a new Zeebo Football Club game, called Zeebo F.C. Super League; a series of titles from Disney Interactive Studios, including Disney All Star Cards, Alice in Wonderland and Jelly Car 2; and a series of titles based on the popular Monica's Gang ("Turma da Monica") comic books in Brazil from cartoonist Mauricio de Sousa.

In Mexico, the console includes five free embedded game titles (Crash Bandicoot Nitro Kart 3D, Pac Mania, Tekken 2, Zenonia and Zeebo Family Pack). More than a dozen games were available for wireless purchase at the time of the Mexican launch in November 2009. More than a dozen more have since been introduced, all in Spanish. Zeebo has also announced that the English language teaching company Interlingua will be developing entertainment and education applications for the console.

In addition to games and educational content, the console provides access to more than 50 web sites, grouped in subject categories, called "Z-Channels."

Technical specifications
 ARM11 / QDSP-5 in Qualcomm MSM7201 SoC running at 528 MHz
 ATI Imageon, later renamed to Adreno
 1 GB eNAND Flash
 128 MB NAND Flash in MCP
 160 MB RAM, 128 MB DDR SDRAM in MCP + 32 MB stacked DDR SDRAM in MSM7201A
Resolution: VGA (640×480) – 4:3 aspect ratio
 3G (scaling back to 2.5G or 2G where necessary)
 3 USB ports 2.0 Standard A (for accessories)
 SD Card Slot / Interface
Interface: USB HID
Power: AC adapter 5V 3A
Consumption: 15 Watt max. 1 watt standard.
Graphics: 4 million triangles / second
Audio: 8 channels simultaneous MP3, ADPCM, MIDI
Size: W × D × H – 157 × 215.4 × 44 mm
Weight: Less than 
Operating System: Qualcomm BREW

Development
Content for the Zeebo is based on the BREW platform and is created using the Zeebo SDK, downloadable from the Zeebo Inc. website. Gamepad peripherals are made possible by a BREW extension. The Zeebo system supports OpenGL ES 1.0/1.1. Applications are downloaded wirelessly over-the-air and commonly range in size from 5–25MB, though games content can be as large as 50MB on device.

References

External links

 Corporate Website (Archive) 

 
ARM-based video game consoles
Home video game consoles
Seventh-generation video game consoles
Products introduced in 2009
2000s toys
2010s toys